Israel lobby may refer to:
Israel lobby in the United States
Israel lobby in the United Kingdom
The Israel Lobby and U.S. Foreign Policy, a book by John Mearsheimer and Stephen Walt
The Lobby (TV series)

See also 
Jewish lobby